Stanisław Prauss (3 April 1902 – 23 April 1967) was a Polish painter. His work was part of the painting event in the art competition at the 1928 Summer Olympics. Not to be confused with Polish aeronautical engineer Stanisław Prauss (1903-1997).

References

1903 births
1997 deaths
20th-century Polish painters
20th-century Polish male artists
Olympic competitors in art competitions
Artists from Warsaw
Polish male painters